Petr Pokorny may refer to:
Petr Pokorný (composer) (1932–2008), Czech pianist and composer 
Petr Pokorný (theologian) (1933–2020), Czech biblical scholar
Petr Pokorný (footballer) (born 1975), Czech footballer